Ognjen Spahić (born 1977 in Podgorica, Montenegro), is a Montenegrin novelist. Spahić has published two collections of short stories: Sve to (All That, 2001) and Zimska potraga (Winter Search, 2007). His novel Hansenova djeca (Hansen's Children, 2004) won him the 2005 Meša Selimović Prize for the best new novel from Croatia, Serbia, Montenegro and Bosnia-Herzegovina. To date, Hansenova djeca has been published in French, Italian, Slovenian, Romanian, Hungarian, Macedonian and English by the UK publisher Istros Books

His short story “Raymond is No Longer with Us—Carver is Dead” was included in the anthology Best European Fiction 2011 published by Dalkey Archive Press in the USA. In 2007, he was a writing resident at the University of Iowa's International Writing Program.

In 2011, he was the recipient of Romania's Ovid Festival Prize, awarded to a prominent young talent.

Awards and honours
2014 European Union Prize for Literature, Montenegro, Puna glava radosti

Bibliography
 "Hansen’s Children" London: Istros Books, 2011.
 Zimska potraga [‘Winter Search’].  Zagreb: Durieux, 2007.
 Hansenova djeca [Hansen's Children’].  Zagreb: Durieux, 2004.
 Sve to [‘All That’].  Ulcinj: Plima, 2001.

References

Ognjen Spahic's novel, 'Hansen's Children' published in English, 2012 http://istrosbooks.com/products/books/hansens-children-2/

External links
Ognjen Spahic's novel, 'Hansen's Children' published in English

1977 births
Living people
Writers from Podgorica
International Writing Program alumni